Selišči is a village in the Municipality of Sveti Jurij ob Ščavnici in northeastern Slovenia. The area is part of the traditional region of Styria and is now included in the Mura Statistical Region.

The village chapel was built in the Neo-Gothic style in 1927.

References

External links
Selišči at Geopedia

Populated places in the Municipality of Sveti Jurij ob Ščavnici